Chorley Rugby Union Club is an English rugby union club based in Chorley, Lancashire. The club currently runs 1 senior team, the 1st XV playing in North Lancashire 2.  The club emblem is derived from the Chorley Borough coat of arms and the team colours are Black and White hoops.

For up to date training information please see the clubs social media pages.

History
Chorley RUFC was founded in 1973 and initially played their matches on the playing fields of Astley Park. In 1981 the club moved to its own ground at Chancery Road, which remains the club's current location.

References

External links
 Official club website

English rugby union teams
Rugby clubs established in 1973
1973 establishments in England
Sport in Chorley